Aleksandr Nikolayevich Puchkov (born 25 March 1957 in Ulyanovsk) is a retired male hurdler and Olympic bronze medallist, who competed for the Soviet Union during his career.

Achievements

External links
Sporting Heroes

1957 births
Living people
Soviet male hurdlers
Russian male hurdlers
Athletes (track and field) at the 1980 Summer Olympics
Olympic athletes of the Soviet Union
Olympic bronze medalists for the Soviet Union
Olympic bronze medalists in athletics (track and field)
Universiade medalists in athletics (track and field)
Universiade bronze medalists for the Soviet Union
Medalists at the 1980 Summer Olympics
Medalists at the 1979 Summer Universiade
Sportspeople from Ulyanovsk